Nizamuddin West is an upscale residential locality, conveniently located south of India gate. It is a historically busy neighbourhood in Central Delhi and has many parks and trees. 
It sits in the green lung of delhi, with Humayun's Tomb, Sunder Nursery and Delhi Golf club around it.
The popular landmarks around it are Khan Market, Lodi Garden, Oberoi Hotel.
It is well connected with Public transport.

History
The Nizamuddin West locality located in Central Delhi is named after 13th century Sufi saint, Nizamuddin Auliya, whose shrine or dargah in Urdu is situated within the area.   With the opening of the Nizamuddin Metro Station on the Pink Line, the prices of the colony are expected to rise further. 

The colony has been home to noted writers, scholars and freedom fighters in the past. Noted Islamic scholar and peace activist, Padam Bhushan Maulana Wahiduddin Khan lives here. The first Chief Executive Councillor of Delhi and veteran freedom fighter Padma Shri Mir Mushtaq Ahmad resided here. Amarnath Vidyalankar, freedom fighter and former MP was also a resident.

Historic sites

 The tomb of Nizamuddin Auliya
 The Jama 'at-Khana-Masjid or Khalji mosque built in 1325 by Khizr Khan, son of Alauddin Khalji
 The shrine to Amir Khusrow
 The grave of the 19th-century Urdu poet Mirza Ghalib and the adjacent Ghalib Academy
 The tomb of Khan i Jahan Tilangani.
 Kalan Masjid

See also
List of Monuments of National Importance in Delhi
Lodi Gardens
Humayun's Tomb
Tomb of Bahlul Lodi

Notes

Neighbourhoods in Delhi